Jerónimo y Avileses is a village and a district in Murcia, Spain. It is part of the municipality of Murcia and is located in the south-east of the municipality. It has an area of 39.437 km2 and had a population of 1,701 in 2020.

Demographics 
51.028% inhabitants are foreigners – 27.92% come from other country of Europe, 20.81% are Africans, 2.116% are Americans and 0.176% are Asians. The table below shows the population trends in the 21st century by its five-year periods.

References

Murcia
Populated places in the Region of Murcia